Alf Malland (24 January 1917 – 16 August 1997) was a Norwegian actor.

Biography
He was born in Bergen, Norway. He began his acting career as a student at the Det Norske Teatret in  Oslo. Following the German occupation of Norway during World War II,  he quit as a theater student and participated in the resistance.  Malland first went to Sweden and in 1942 he left  for Great Britain where he trained as a paratrooper. He arrived at Finnmark in November 1944 as company commander with the Norwegian forces.

In 1946, he was again at Det Norske Teatret and took up his theater studies. He was first employed there then freelanced. He appeared in 42 films and television shows between 1949 and 1987. He starred in the film Struggle for Eagle Peak, which was entered into the 10th Berlin International Film Festival.

Partial filmography

 Death Is a Caress (1949) - En konstabel (uncredited)
 Trine! (1952) - En politimann
 Ung frue forsvunnet (1953) - Vaktmannen (uncredited)
 Skøytekongen (1953)
 Trost i taklampa (1955)
 Hjem går vi ikke (1955)
 Nine Lives (1957) - Martin
 Pastor Jarman kommer hjem (1958) - Tor
 Struggle for Eagle Peak (1960) - Tomas Gran
 Omringet (1960) - Frimann
 Et øye på hver finger (1961) - Mørk herre i svart bil
 Cold Tracks (1962) - Tormod
 Freske fraspark (1963) - Ollvar
 Marenco (1964) - Chowski
 Klokker i måneskinn (1964) - Styrmannen, 'Journalistens fortelling'
 To på topp (1965) - Pengeinnkreveren
 Vaktpostene (1965) - Kapteinen
 Broder Gabrielsen (1966) - Broder Gabrielsen
 Smuglere (1968)
 An-Magritt (1969) - Merra-Per
 One Day in the Life of Ivan Denisovich (1970) - Fetiukov
 Love Is War (1971) - Doctor
 The Call of the Wild (1972) - Constantine
 Bør Børson Jr. (1974) - Ole Elveplassen
 Ransom (1974) - Police Inspector
 Kjære Maren (1976) - Mann
 Bør Børson II (1976) - Ole Elveplassen
 Olsenbanden for full musikk (1976) - Fritz, altmuligmann
 Karjolsteinen (1977) - Politibetj.
 Olsenbanden og Data-Harry sprenger verdensbanken (1978) - Hallandsen, kjeltring
 Blood of the Railroad Workers (1979) - Per flink
 Olsenbanden gir seg aldri! (1981) - Aksjonsleder i politiet
 Olsenbandens aller siste kupp (1982) - Personalvakt med overvåkning
 Men Olsenbanden var ikke død! (1984) - Guide på Munchmuseet
 Etter Rubicon (1987) - Arne Michelsen

References

External links

1917 births
1997 deaths
Norwegian male stage actors
Norwegian male film actors
Norwegian male television actors
20th-century Norwegian male actors
Norwegian resistance members
Norwegian military personnel of World War II
Actors from Bergen